Panchah (also Romanized as Panchāh) is a village in Kisom Rural District, in the Central District of Astaneh-ye Ashrafiyeh County, Gilan Province, Iran. At the 2006 census, its population was 799, in 253 families.

Historical Buildings 
Buq'eh Sayyid Muhammad b. Imam Ja'far Sadiq with wall paintings related to Shia history.

References 

Populated places in Astaneh-ye Ashrafiyeh County